Allah Nur (also Romanized as Allāh Nūr; also known as Qareh Meshk) is a village in Maraveh Tappeh Rural District, in the Central District of Maraveh Tappeh County, Golestan Province, Iran. At the 2006 census, its population was 184, in 37 families.

References 

Populated places in Maraveh Tappeh County